() or Route 30 is a national road in the Southern Region of Iceland. It runs from Route 1 east of Þjórsá, through the village of Flúðir to the intersection of Biskupstungnabraut.

References

Roads in Iceland